Voss Veksel- og Landmandsbank or Vekselbanken is a Norwegian commercial bank located in Voss, Hordaland. It is the only remaining independent commercial bank that had not merged into DnB NOR, Nordea, Fokus Bank or a sparebank.

History
The bank is listed on the Oslo Stock Exchange and was founded in 1899 to provide services to the labourers working on building the Bergen Line through Voss.

Banks of Norway
Companies based in Hordaland
Banks established in 1899
Companies listed on the Oslo Stock Exchange
1899 establishments in Norway